Phallobrycon adenacanthus is a species of characin endemic to Brazil, where it is found in the Rio Xingu basin.

References

Characidae
Fish of South America
Fish of Brazil
Endemic fauna of Brazil
Fish described in 2009